Eupithecia thomasina is a moth in the family Geometridae. It is found on São Tomé.

References

Moths described in 1927
thomasina
Moths of Africa